Translation (stylized in all caps) is the eighth studio album by American pop rap group Black Eyed Peas. It was released on June 19, 2020, by Epic Records. The album features guest appearances from Shakira, J Balvin, Ozuna, Maluma, Nicky Jam, Tyga, El Alfa, Piso 21, Becky G, French Montana and J Rey Soul.

The track listing was revealed on June 11, 2020, alongside the album announcement. "No Mañana" was released as a promotional single on June 12, 2020, along with the album's cover art. The album was also promoted with two Hot Latin Songs chart toppers, "Ritmo (Bad Boys for Life)" and "Mamacita".

Commercial performance
The album sold 15,000 album-equivalent units, measured largely from streaming revenue – 14 million streams of album tracks through on-demand services, measured as 10,000 streaming equivalent albums – while 4,000 units were traditional album sales. The performance earned the album a chart debut at number 52 on the Billboard 200 and at number three on the Top Latin Albums, which was the group's first top-five appearance on the latter chart. The album is their first to enter the Billboard 200 chart since The Beginning (2010).

Critical reception

Translation was met with generally favorable reviews. At Metacritic, which assigns a normalized rating out of 100 to reviews from professional critics, the album received a weighted average score of 63, based on four reviews.

Reviewing in June 2020 for Rolling Stone, Gary Suarez said the "often clunky" album shows the group exploiting the contemporary Latin pop trend, albeit with occasional charm. In Variety, A. D. Amorosi believed songs such as "I Woke Up" and "Get Loose Now" sound as if they were focus grouped for Latin audiences, but said of the album overall, "BEP have found a new sense of adventure, inventiveness and contagion through the modern Latin music prism." Ingrid Angulo from Hot Press was more impressed, applauding their foray into reggaeton and saying, "The collaborations are seamless and the tracks as catchy as ever, cementing the modern global success of Latin-inspired dance music." Tom Hull was also relatively positive, writing in his blog, "Seems like they had a perfectly functional hip-hop/funk album on tap for summer release, then wound up adding a most atypical and remarkable topical song, 'News Today'."

Track listing

Notes
 signifies a co-producer
 signifies an additional producer
"Ritmo" is listed as "Ritmo (Bad Boys for Life)" on digital versions of the album.
All tracks are stylized in all caps on streaming services, for example, "Mamacita" is stylized as "MAMACITA".
"Ritmo" contains a sample of "The Rhythm of the Night" by Corona.
"Feel the Beat" contains a sample of "Can You Feel the Beat" by Lisa Lisa and Cult Jam.
"Mamacita" contains a sample of "La Isla Bonita" by Madonna.
"Vida Loca" contains interpolations of "Super Freak" by Rick James and "U Can't Touch This" by MC Hammer.
"Celebrate" contains a sample of "Conga" by the Miami Sound Machine.
"Mabuti" contains a sample of "I Don't Know What It Is, But It Sure Is Funky" by Ripple.

Personnel
Black Eyed Peas
 will.i.am – vocals on all tracks except 7, piano, keyboards, drum programming, programming
 apl.de.ap – vocals on all tracks except 7, 10, 13, and 16 (Japanese edition)
 Taboo – vocals on all tracks except 1, 7, 11, 13, 16, and 17 (Japanese edition)
 J. Rey Soul – vocals on tracks 2, 3, 5, 7, 8, 11, and 12

Charts

Weekly charts

Year-end charts

Certifications

References

2020 albums
Albums produced by will.i.am
Black Eyed Peas albums
Epic Records albums
Albums produced by Johnny Goldstein
Trap music albums
Reggaeton albums